Chaya Mughal (born 20 June 1986) is an Indian-born cricketer who plays for the United Arab Emirates national cricket team and is the current captain of the national team.

Personal life
Mughal grew up in Jammu and Kashmir. She moved to the UAE in 2009 and is a schoolteacher by profession. As of January 2022 she taught at the Ambassador School in Dubai.

Cricket career
Before moving to the UAE, Mughal represented Jammu and Kashmir state in Indian domestic cricket. In July 2018, she was named in the UAE squad for the 2018 ICC Women's World Twenty20 Qualifier tournament. She made her WT20I debut against Netherlands on 7 July 2018.

Mughal captained UAE at the 2021 ICC Women's T20 World Cup Asia Qualifier, with her team emerging undefeated to progress to the 2022 ICC Women's T20 World Cup Qualifier. She retained the captaincy for the qualifier which the UAE hosted in September 2022.
In October 2022, she captained UAE team in Women's Twenty20 Asia Cup.

References

Further reading

External links
 

1986 births
Living people
Cricketers from Jammu and Kashmir
Sportswomen from Jammu and Kashmir
Indian women cricketers
Emirati women cricketers
United Arab Emirates women Twenty20 International cricketers
Women cricket captains
Indian emigrants to the United Arab Emirates
Indian expatriate sportspeople in the United Arab Emirates